Wesley Township may refer to the following townships in the United States:

 Wesley Township, Will County, Illinois
 Wesley Township, Kossuth County, Iowa
 Wesley Township, Washington County, Ohio